Nathan Wetherell D.D. (1726–1808) was an academic administrator at the University of Oxford. He was Dean of Hereford, Master of University College, Oxford and Vice-Chancellor of Oxford University.

Nathan Wetherell was originally from Durham.

As Vice-Chancellor of Oxford, he set up the Oxford Paving Commission in 1771 to supervise paving, cleaning and lighting in the city of Oxford.
He supported anti-Calvinism, along with David Durell and Thomas Randolph.
Wetherell was a longtime friend of Samuel Johnson.

A memorial to Wetherell was erected in University College Chapel at Oxford University sculpted by John Flaxman.

Family
Wetherell was married to Richarda Croke (1743?–1812), sister of Sir Alexander Croke, of Studley Priory, Oxfordshire.
His third son was the judge and Member of Parliament, Sir Charles Wetherell (1770–1846).

References 

1726 births
1808 deaths
English theologians
Deans of Hereford
People from Durham, England
Masters of University College, Oxford
Vice-Chancellors of the University of Oxford
Doctors of Divinity